Joseph Peter Kerwin (born February 19, 1932) is an American physician and former NASA astronaut, who served as Science Pilot for the Skylab 2 mission from May 25 – June 22, 1973. He was the first physician to be selected for astronaut training. Joe Kerwin was the one who uttered the words during Apollo 13: “Farewell, Aquarius, and we thank you.”  Kerwin was inducted into the United States Astronaut Hall of Fame in 1997.

Early years and education 
Born of Irish descent in Oak Park, Illinois, on February 19, 1932, Kerwin graduated from Fenwick High School, a private school in Oak Park, in 1949. He received a Bachelor of Arts degree in Philosophy from the College of the Holy Cross, Worcester, Massachusetts, in 1953; a Doctor of Medicine degree from Northwestern University Medical School, Chicago, Illinois, in 1957; completed his internship at the District of Columbia General Hospital in Washington, D.C.; and attended the United States Navy School of Aviation Medicine at Naval Air Station Pensacola, Florida, being designated a naval flight surgeon in December 1958.

Military career 
Kerwin was a Captain in the Navy Medical Corps, commissioned in July 1958. He earned his flight surgeon's wings at Beeville, Texas, in 1962. He has logged 4,500 hours flying time.

NASA career 

Kerwin was selected for NASA Astronaut Group 4 as a scientist-astronaut in June 1965. He was serving as a pilot and a flight surgeon for the Navy at the time of his selection. He was one of the capsule communicators (CAPCOMs) on Apollo 13 (in 1970).

He served as Science Pilot for the Skylab 2 (SL-2) mission which launched on May 25 and splashed down on June 22, 1973. With him for the initial activation and 28-day flight qualification operations of the Skylab Orbital Workshop were Charles "Pete" Conrad (spacecraft commander) and Paul J. Weitz (Pilot).

Kerwin was subsequently in charge of the on-orbit branch of the Astronaut Office, where he coordinated astronaut activity involving rendezvous, satellite deployment and retrieval, and other Space Shuttle payload operations. Kerwin was part of the NBC broadcasting team for coverage of the launch of STS-1.

From 1982–83, Kerwin served as NASA's senior science representative in Australia. In this capacity, he served as liaison between NASA's Office of Space Tracking and Data Systems and Australia's Commonwealth Scientific and Industrial Research Organisation. During this time, Kerwin was considered to fly on the mission that would become STS-41-C (then known as STS-13), but his assignment in Australia prevented his selection.

From 1984–1987, Kerwin served as Director of Space and Life Sciences at the Johnson Space Center. There, he was responsible for direction and coordination of medical support to operational crewed spacecraft programs, including health care and maintenance of the astronauts and their families; for direction of life services, supporting research and light experiment project; and for managing JSC earth sciences and scientific efforts in lunar and planetary research. In 1986, he issued a report on the deaths of the crew killed in the Challenger disaster to Associate Administrator for Space Flight, Richard H. Truly.

Post-NASA career 
Kerwin retired from the Navy, left NASA, and joined Lockheed in 1987. At Lockheed, he managed the Extravehicular Systems Project, providing hardware for Space Station Freedom, from 1988 to 1990; with Paul Cottingham and Ted Christian invented the Simplified Aid for EVA Rescue (SAFER), first tested for use by space walking astronauts on the International Space Station (ISS) during Space Shuttle flight STS-64. He then served on the Assured Crew Return Vehicle team, and served as Study Manager on the Human Transportation Study, a NASA review of future space transportation architectures. In 1994–95 he led the Houston liaison group for Lockheed Martin's FGB contract, the procurement of the Russian "space tug" which has become the first element of the ISS. He served on the NASA Advisory Council from 1990 to 1993.

He joined Systems Research Laboratories (SRL) in June 1996, to serve as Program Manager of the SRL team which bid to win the Medical Support and Integration Contract at the Johnson Space Center. The incumbent, KRUG Life Sciences, was selected. Then, to his surprise, KRUG recruited him to replace its retiring president, T. Wayne Holt. He joined KRUG on April 1, 1997. On March 16, 1998, KRUG Life Sciences became the Life Sciences Special Business Unit of Wyle Laboratories of El Segundo, California.

In addition to his duties at Wyle, Kerwin serves on the Board of Directors of the National Space Biomedical Research Institute (NSBRI) as an industry representative.  He retired from Wyle in the summer of 2004.

Personal life 
Kerwin married Shirley Ann  of Danville, Pennsylvania in 1960. They have three daughters: Sharon (born September 14, 1963), Joanna (born January 5, 1966), and Kristina (born May 4, 1968); and six grandchildren. His hobbies are reading and classical music. He resides in College Station, Texas with his family.

Organizations
He is a fellow of the Aerospace Medical Association, and a member of the Aircraft Owners and Pilots Association.

Awards and honors
 NASA Distinguished Service Medal

The all-Navy crew was awarded the Navy Distinguished Service Medal in 1973 from the Secretary of the Navy. The three Skylab astronaut crews were awarded the 1973 Robert J. Collier Trophy "For proving beyond question the value of man in future explorations of space and the production of data of benefit to all the people on Earth."  Gerald Carr accepted the 1975 Dr. Robert H. Goddard Memorial Trophy from President Ford, awarded to the Skylab astronauts. The Skylab crew was awarded AIAA's Haley Astronautics Award for 1974.

He was one of 24 Apollo astronauts who were inducted into the U.S. Astronaut Hall of Fame in 1997.

Books
Kerwin is co-author, along with fellow astronaut Owen K. Garriott and writer David Hitt, of Homesteading Space, a history of the Skylab program published in 2008.

In films
Kerwin is portrayed by Jack Hogan in the 1974 TV movie Houston, We've Got a Problem.

Joe Kerwin appears as himself in the 2018 documentary film Searching for Skylab.

See also

List of spaceflight records
The Astronaut Monument

References

External links

Astronautix biography of Joseph P. Kerwin
Kewrin at Encyclopedia of Science

Official publisher website for Homesteading Space

1932 births
Living people
1973 in spaceflight
American people of Irish descent
American philosophers
United States Navy Medical Corps officers
Physician astronauts
United States Navy astronauts
Apollo program astronauts
Aviators from Illinois
Physicians from Illinois
Military personnel from Illinois
United States Astronaut Hall of Fame inductees
Writers from Chicago
College of the Holy Cross alumni
Feinberg School of Medicine alumni
Recipients of the Navy Distinguished Service Medal
Recipients of the NASA Distinguished Service Medal
NASA people
Lockheed Martin people
20th-century American physicians
20th-century American businesspeople
Skylab program astronauts
People from Oak Park, Illinois
Spacewalkers